Thomas Everett "Pete" Jones Jr. (July 15, 1919 – March 26, 1992) was an American Negro league catcher in the 1940s.

A native of Charles City, Virginia, Jones played for the Philadelphia Stars in 1946. In seven recorded games, he posted three hits in 13 plate appearances. Jones died in Charles City in 1992 at age 72.

References

External links
 and Seamheads

1919 births
1992 deaths
Philadelphia Stars players
20th-century African-American sportspeople